The Tour of Anchorage is a point-to-point cross-country ski race held annually on the first Sunday in March in Anchorage, Alaska. Established in 1989, it is part of the American Ski Marathon Series.

Course
The race includes three distances of 50 km, 40km, and 25km, each with a freestyle and classic option. The 50km and 40 km races begin at Service High School, while the 25 km race begins at Alaska Pacific University. All races end in the stadium at Kincaid Park, except in 2021, Kincaid Stadium.

Strict measures were undertaken in 2021, such as athletes to wear masks & social distancing from others.

External links
 

1988 establishments in Alaska
Annual events in Alaska
Cross-country skiing competitions
March events
Recurring sporting events established in 1988
Ski marathons in the United States
Sports in Anchorage, Alaska
Tourist attractions in Anchorage, Alaska